The filmography of Michael Sheard.

Film

Television

Videos

External links
 

Male actor filmographies
British filmographies
Scottish filmographies